Jasem Bahman (born 15 February 1958) is a Kuwaiti football goalkeeper who played for Kuwait in the 1982 FIFA World Cup. He also played for Qadsia SC.

References

External links
FIFA profile

1958 births
Kuwaiti footballers
Kuwait international footballers
Association football goalkeepers
Qadsia SC players
1982 FIFA World Cup players
Living people
1980 AFC Asian Cup players
AFC Asian Cup-winning players
Asian Games medalists in football
Footballers at the 1982 Asian Games
Asian Games silver medalists for Kuwait
Medalists at the 1982 Asian Games
Kuwait Premier League players